The Dutch Navy Museum is a naval museum in Den Helder, Netherlands.

The museum is dedicated to the history of the Koninklijke Marine (Royal Netherlands Navy).

The most important ships the museum owns are:
 (minesweeper)
 (ironclad ram)
 (submarine)
 (steamship) (under restoration)
 (guided missile destroyer) (Deck and radar)

References

Maritime museums in the Netherlands
Military and war museums in the Netherlands
Naval museums
Museums in North Holland